Aber-arad is a village in the Welsh principal area of Carmarthenshire.  Aber-Arad lies less than one mile to the east of Newcastle Emlyn.

In 1870–72, John Marius Wilson in the Imperial Gazetteer of England and Wales described Aber Arad as:

ABERARAD, a village in the parish of Kenarth, Carmarthen; a mile east of Newcastle-Emlyn.

References

Villages in Carmarthenshire
Newcastle Emlyn